Danu is a commune in Glodeni District, Moldova. It is composed of three villages: Camencuța, Danu and Nicolaevca.

Notable people
 
 
 Alexei Crăcan (born 1960), Moldovan Ambassador to Latvia

References

Communes of Glodeni District